Kebara Cave is a limestone cave locality in Wadi Kebara, situated at  above sea level on the western escarpment of the Carmel Range, in the Ramat HaNadiv preserve of Zichron Yaakov.

History
The cave was inhabited between 60,000 and 48,000 BP and is famous for its excavated finds of hominid remains.

Dorothy Garrod and Francis Turville-Petre excavated in the cave in the early 1930s. Excavations have since yielded a large number of human remains associated with a Mousterian archaeological context. The first specimen discovered in 1965, during the excavations of M. Stekelis, was an incomplete infant skeleton (Kebara 1).

The most significant discovery made at Kebara Cave was Kebara 2 in 1982, the most complete postcranial Neanderthal skeleton found to date. Nicknamed "Moshe" and dating to circa 60,000 BP, the skeleton preserved a large part of one individual's torso (vertebral column, ribs and pelvis). The cranium and most of the lower limbs were missing. The hyoid bone was also preserved, and was the first Neanderthal hyoid bone found.

The Kebaran culture is named after the site.

See also 
 Archaeology in Israel
 List of fossil sites (with link directory)
 List of hominid fossils
 List of notable fossils
 List of transitional fossils

References

Further reading
 Schick, T. & Stekelis, M. "Mousterian Assemblages in Kebara Cave, Mount Carmel", Eretz-Israel 13 (1977), pp. 97–150.
 Bar-Yosef, O. & B. Vandermeersch, et alii, "The Excavations in Kebara Cave, Mount Carmel", Current Anthropology 33.5 (1992), pp. 497–546.
 Goldberg, P. & Bar-Yosef, O., "Site formation processes in Kebara and Hayonim Caves and their significance in Levantine Prehistoric caves", in T. Akazawa, K. Aoki and O. Bar-Yosef (eds), Neandertals and Modern Humans in Western Asia, New York & London: Plenum Press, 1998, pp.?
 Albert, Rosa M., Steve Weiner, Ofer Bar-Yosef, and Liliane Meignen, "Phytoliths of the Middle Palaeolithic Deposits of Kebara Cave, Mt. Carmel, Israel: Study of the Plant Materials Used for Fuel and Other Purposes", Journal of Archaeological Science 27 (2000), pp. 931–947.
 Lev, Efraim, Kislev, Mordechai E. & Bar-Yosef, Ofer, "Mousterian Vegetal Food in Kebara Cave, Mt Carmel", Journal of Archaeological Science 32 (2005), pp. 475–484.

External links

 Ramat Hanadiv - the Rothschild Memorial public gardens at Ramat HaNadiv preserve the Kebara Cave within their boundaries for visitors
 Kebara Cave at About.com

1930s archaeological discoveries
Caves of Israel
Neanderthal sites
Prehistoric sites in Israel
Archaeological type sites
Mount Carmel
Mousterian
Kebaran culture